Rhombophryne is a genus of microhylid frogs endemic to Madagascar. It is currently estimated to include more than 23 species, but only 20 of these are currently described. The common name 'diamond frog' has been proposed and used for members of this genus.

Taxonomy
The genus Rhombophryne was monotypic until 2005, containing just R. testudo Boettger, 1880. However, in 2005 Andreone et al. showed that the genus Plethodontohyla was paraphyletic with respect to this genus. Several species were therefore transferred to this genus by Frost et al. in 2006, Glaw and Vences in 2007, and Wollenberg et al. in 2008. In 2015/2016, Peloso et al. re-analysed the genetic relationships of the Microhylidae using partial genomic data. They proposed the synonymy of Stumpffia with Rhombophryne because these genera were found to be paraphyletic. However, in 2016 Scherz et al. re-analysed their data with new data—including osteology and external morphology. They found strong support for these groups being ecologically distinct, non-synonymous sister taxa. To accommodate this, however, they established a new genus, Anilany for a species that would otherwise have rendered Stumpffia paraphyletic. These findings were supported by a subsequent study on the phylogeny of the family Microhylidae.

At present at least one species group is recognised: the Rhombophryne serratopalpebrosa species group, containing R. serratopalpebrosa, R. guentherpetersi, R. coronata, R. vaventy, R. tany, R. ornata, R. regalis, and R. diadema. This group is recognised due to the clearly synapomorphic superciliary spines (spines above the eyes) shared by all of its members, in addition to its consistent monophyly in various phylogenetic reconstructions. Other species groups have yet to be established.

In early 2018, Bellati et al. moved the species Rhombophryne alluaudi to Plethodontohyla based on examination of the type material; specimens in phylogenetic analyses that had been referred to as R. alluaudi in fact belong to an undescribed species of Rhombophryne.

Ecomorphology
Members of the genus Rhombophryne are ecologically and morphologically diverse. The type species, R. testudo shows many specialisations to burrowing, such as a short head, short limbs, and large metatarsal tubercles, as do its two closest relatives, R. matavy and R. coudreaui. Most other species have a stout body shape which may suggest partially burrowing habits as well. Rhombophryne minuta and R. longicrus by contrast have unusually long limbs, and it has been argued that they probably are more terrestrial and saltatorial than the other members of the genus. Rhombophryne proportinalis is a miniaturised species, attaining an adult body size of 11–12 mm. It was argued to be a proportional dwarf in its original description, based on its non-paedomorphic proportions compared to similarly sized Cophylinae frogs.

Reproductive Ecology
The mating habits of most species of Rhombophryne are not known. It is likely that all members of this genus engage in parental care, which is common to most members of the Cophylinae. Two adult R. testudo individuals were found together with 18 putative offspring in a burrow by a stream at the edge of Lokobe Reserve on Nosy Be, at the end of the dry season. This is the only direct evidence of reproductive behaviour in this genus. So far, the advertisement calls of eight species have been published: R. botabota, R. minuta, R. mangabensis, R. matavy, R. testudo, R. nilevina, R. coronata, and R. proportionalis. Most of their calls are honking sounds emitted after quite long intervals, but R. minuta emits paired notes, and R. proportionalis emits series of 9–17 notes.

Species
 Rhombophryne botabota Scherz, Glaw, Vences, Andreone & Crottini, 2016
 Rhombophryne coronata (Vences and Glaw, 2003)
 Rhombophryne coudreaui (Angel, 1938)
 Rhombophryne diadema Scherz, Hawlitschek, Andreone, Rakotoarison, Vences & Glaw, 2017
 Rhombophryne guentherpetersi (Guibé, 1974)
 Rhombophryne laevipes (Mocquard, 1895)
 Rhombophryne longicrus Scherz, Rakotoarison, Hawlitschek, Vences & Glaw, 2015
 Rhombophryne mangabensis Glaw, Köhler & Vences, 2010
 Rhombophryne matavy D'Cruze, Köhler, Vences & Glaw, 2010
 Rhombophryne minuta (Guibé, 1975)
 Rhombophryne nilevina Lambert, Hutter & Scherz, 2017
 Rhombophryne ornata Scherz, Ruthensteiner, Vieites, Vences & Glaw, 2015
Rhombophryne proportinalis Scherz, Hutter, Rakotoarison, Riemann, Rödel, Ndriantsoa, Glos, Roberts, Crottini, Vences & Glaw, 2019
 Rhombophryne regalis Scherz, Hawlitschek, Andreone, Rakotoarison, Vences & Glaw, 2017
 Rhombophryne savaka Scherz, Glaw, Vences, Andreone & Crottini, 2016
 Rhombophryne serratopalpebrosa (Guibé, 1975)
 Rhombophryne tany Scherz, Ruthensteiner, Vieites, Vences & Glaw, 2015
 Rhombophryne testudo Boettger, 1880
 Rhombophryne vaventy Scherz, Ruthensteiner, Vences & Glaw, 2014
 Rhombophryne ellae Scherz, 2020

References

 
Endemic frogs of Madagascar
Amphibian genera
Taxa named by Oskar Boettger
Taxonomy articles created by Polbot